General elections were held in Vanuatu on 2 December 1991. Ni-Vanuatu voters were invited to elect the 46 members of the national Parliament.

At the time of the elections, Walter Lini of the Vanua'aku Pati had been Prime Minister for eleven years and the country's only leader since independence in 1980. Several months before the elections, he was replaced by Donald Kalpokas as leader of the Vanua'aku Pati, and formed his own National United Party.

Seven parties contested the election. The Union of Moderate Parties obtained 19 seats, the same number as during the previous election, but this time these were sufficient to place it in the lead. The Vanua'aku Pati and the National United Party obtained ten seats each, marking the VP's first electoral defeat.

With no absolute majority, the Union of Moderate Parties formed a ruling coalition with the NUP. Maxime Carlot Korman (UMP) became Vanuatu's first francophone Prime Minister, with NUP co-founder Sethy Regenvanu as deputy Prime Minister. Voter turnout was 71%.

The result was significant, as Vanuatu's previous post-independence governments had been oriented towards the Anglophone population. Prior to the 1991 elections, only ten percent of the Vanuatu administration was Francophone and no cabinet members had been Francophone since independence. Vanuatu's foreign policy had also been hostile to France.

Electoral system
Most members were elected by single non-transferable vote in multi-seat districts having two to six members each. Four members were elected through first-past-the-post voting in single-member constituencies.

Results

See also
List of members of the Parliament of Vanuatu (1991–1995)

References

Vanuatu
General
Elections in Vanuatu
Vanuatu